The Samsung Galaxy J1 is an Android smartphone developed by Samsung Electronics. It was released in January 2015 and is the first phone of the Galaxy J series. It was marketed as an entry-level device starting at $100.

History 
The Galaxy J1 was announced in January 2015 as the first model of the J series. The 3G model was released in February 2015, the 4G model one month after. In the following months Samsung launched more smartphones bearing the J1 name such as the J1 Ace/Ace Neo, J1 Nxt/mini and J1 mini prime.

In January 2016, the successor Galaxy J1 (2016) was released.

Specifications

Hardware 
The Samsung Galaxy J1 is available in a 3G and a 4G version. Both models have an ARM Cortex-A7 CPU with either two (3G) or four cores (4G) with 512 MB (3G) or 768 MB (4G) of RAM respectively, and 4 GB of internal storage. The phone also has a slot for a microSD card (up to 256 gigabytes) and dual SIM card support. The rear camera's resolution is 5 megapixels while the front camera is 2 megapixels and both film video at 720p 30 fps.

Software 
The J1 is shipped with Android 4.4.4 "KitKat" and Samsung's TouchWiz user interface. The original model never got updated to Android Lollipop, but got an unofficial Android 7.1.2 "Nougat" custom firmware port on XDA-Developers .

An unofficial port of TWRP exists for this device.

Verizon released a special branded J1 4G. It's shipped with Android 5.0.2 "Lollipop" which is upgradable to 5.1.1 as of September 2015.

See also 
 Samsung Galaxy
 Samsung Galaxy J series

References

External links 
 Official website

Samsung Galaxy
Mobile phones introduced in 2015
Android (operating system) devices
Samsung mobile phones
Mobile phones with user-replaceable battery